The Big Sandy Power Plant is a 268 megawatt (MW), natural gas power plant owned and operated by Kentucky Power Company, a subsidiary of American Electric Power (AEP), on the shores of the Big Sandy River near Louisa, Kentucky. It was established in 1963. It was formerly a coal-fired power plant, but was converted to natural gas in 2016.

Plant Data
Number of Employees: 135
Customers: 175,000+

Emissions Data
2006 CO2 Emissions: 6,830,275 tons
2006 SO2 Emissions: 46,476 tons
2006 SO2 Emissions per MWh:
2006 NOx Emissions: 13,851 tons
2005 Mercury Emissions: 281 lb.

In January 2009, Sue Sturgis of the Institute of Southern Studies compiled a list of the 100 most polluting coal plants in the United States in terms of Coal Combustion Waste (CCW) stored in surface impoundments like the one involved in the TVA Kingston Fossil Plant coal ash spill. The data came from the EPA's Toxics Release Inventory (TRI) for 2006, the most recent year available.

Big Sandy Plant ranked number 40 on the list, with 915,079 pounds of coal combustion waste released to surface impoundments in 2006.

Big Sandy Plant's Fly Ash surface impoundment is on the EPA's official June 2009 list of Coal Combustion Residue (CCR) Surface Impoundments with High Hazard Potential Ratings. The rating applies to sites at which a dam failure would most likely cause loss of human life, but does not assess of the likelihood of such an event.

The data came from the EPA's Toxics Release Inventory (TRI) for 2006, the most recent year available.

Conversion to natural gas
There is a discussion regarding a proposal to convert coal fired plants such as Big Sandy to natural gas to reduce fuel costs, greenhouse gas emissions, and airborne toxins. Initially Big Sandy's owner AEP proposed a billion dollar upgrade to allow it to continue to burn coal, however this upgrade was opposed by environmentalists, and also opposed by electricity consumers who oppose higher rates to pay for the upgrade.

Later AEP agreed to convert to natural gas. Gas is supplied by Columbia Gas and the contractor building the pipeline and valve stations is Eagle Pipeline (contracted by Columbia). Big Sandy's conversion to natural gas was supported by New York City Mayor Michael Bloomberg, as New York is a consumer of Big Sandy's electricity.

Conversion to natural gas was completed on May 30, 2016. The station's Unit 2 cooling tower was demolished via implosion on September 24, 2016.

References

External links
Existing Electric Generating Units in the United States, 2005, Energy Information Administration, accessed January 2009.
Environmental Integrity Project, "Dirty Kilowatts: America's Most Polluting Power Plants", July 2007.
Facility Registry System, U.S. Environmental Protection Agency, accessed January 2009.

Energy infrastructure completed in 1963
Energy infrastructure completed in 1969
Buildings and structures in Lawrence County, Kentucky
1963 establishments in Kentucky
Natural gas-fired power stations in Kentucky
Former coal-fired power stations in the United States
American Electric Power